Harold Ayres (10 March 1920 – 5 March 2002) was an English professional footballer. His clubs included Fulham, and Gillingham, for whom he made over 130 Football League appearances.

References

1920 births
2002 deaths
English footballers
Gillingham F.C. players
Fulham F.C. players
People from Redcar
Footballers from Yorkshire
Association football midfielders